Gary John Martin (born 1958) is an American anthropologist, ethnobotanist and conservationist, known for his 1995 book Ethnobotany: a methods manual, which has been translated into Bahasa Melayu, Mandarin and Spanish.

Gary Martin received from Michigan State University his B.S. in botany in 1980 and from U. C. Berkeley two degrees in anthropology, M.A. in 1982 and Ph.D. in 1996 with thesis Comparative Ethnobotany of the Chinantec and Mixe of the Sierra Norte, Oaxaca, Mexico. He is the Director of the Global Diversity Foundation. He has done applied research and training in ethnobotany and conservation in more than forty-five countries, including the Dominican Republic, India, Mexico, China and Thailand.

Selected publications
with Sergio Madrid: 

with Alison Semple: 

with Abderrahim Ouarghidi, Bronwen Powell, Gabrielle Esser, and Abdelaziz Abbad:

References

1958 births
American anthropologists
Ethnobotanists
American conservationists
Living people